D9, D09, D.IX, D IX, D.9 or D-9 may refer to:

Transport and vehicles
 Albatros D.IX, a 1918 German prototype single-seat fighter
 Bavarian D IX, an 1888 German steam locomotive model
 Bottineau Municipal Airport, FAA LID D09, a public airport in North Dakota, United States
 Caterpillar D9, a 1954 large bulldozer/track-type tractor
 IDF Caterpillar D9, an armored bulldozer
 Donavia, IATA code D9, a former subsidiary of Aeroflot
 D9 road (Croatia), a state road in Croatia
 HMS D9, a 1912 British E class submarine
 HMS Imperial (D09), a 1936 British Royal Navy I-class destroyer
 HMS Trumpeter (D09), a 1942 British Royal Navy escort aircraft carrier
 Jodel D9, a 1948 French single-seat ultralight monoplane
 LNER Class D9, a class of British steam locomotives

Other uses
 ATC code D09, Medicated dressings, a classification for medical products
 D-9 (video), a video format also known as Digital-S
 D9-brane, a class of objects in string theory
 D-IX, a Nazi performance-enhancing drug
 District 9, a 2009 film
 The "Divine Nine" (D9), nickname for the National Pan-Hellenic Council, an African American fraternity council
 Dublin 9, a Dublin, Republic of Ireland postal district
Digital 9, a collaborative network of the world's leading digital governments 
Diensteinheit IX - a military unit of the East German police the Volkspolizei

See also
 9D (disambiguation)
 Dix (disambiguation)